Thailand competed at the 1964 Summer Olympics in Tokyo, Japan. 54 competitors, 47 men and 7 women, took part in 41 events in 8 sports.

Athletics

Boxing

Five boxers represented Thailand in 1964.

 Flyweight
 Veerapan Komolsen

 Bantamweight
 Cherdchai Udompaichitkul

 Light welterweight
 Niyom Prasertsom

 Welterweight
 Sukda Songsang

 Light middleweight
 Yot Thiancharoen

Cycling

Eight cyclists represented Thailand in 1964.

 Individual road race
 Tarwon Jirapan
 Pakdi Chillananda
 Chainarong Sophonpong
 Vitool Charernratana

 Team time trial
 Suwan Ornkerd
 Vitool Charernratana
 Tarwon Jirapan
 Chainarong Sophonpong

 1000m time trial
 Preeda Chullamondhol

 Individual pursuit
 Smaisuk Krisansuwan

 Team pursuit
 Preeda Chullamondhol
 Somchai Chantarasamrit
 Smaisuk Krisansuwan

Judo

Three judoka represented Thailand in 1964.

 Lightweight
 Eiam Harssarungsri
 Udom Rasmelungom

 Middleweight
 Pipat Sinhasema

Sailing

Shooting

Ten shooters represented Thailand in 1964.

25 m pistol
 Sumol Sumontame
 Taweesak Kasiwat

50 m pistol
 Paitoon Smuthranond
 Amorn Yuktanandana

300 m rifle, three positions
 Turong Tousvasu
 Chan Pancharut

50 m rifle, three positions
 Krisada Arunwong
 Salai Srisathorn

50 m rifle, prone
 Choomphol Chaiyanitr
 Hongsa Purnaveja

Swimming

Weightlifting

References

External links
Official Olympic Reports

Nations at the 1964 Summer Olympics
1964 Summer Olympics
1964 in Thai sport